The 2007 Senate election in the Philippines occurred on May 14, 2007 to elect one-half of the Senate. The senators elected in 2007, together with those elected on 2004, will comprise the Senate's delegation in the 14th Congress.

Manner of election
Voting for senators is via nationwide, at-large basis via plurality-at-large voting system. A voter has twelve votes: the voter can vote less than twelve but not more than it. Then votes are tallied nationwide and the twelve candidates with the highest number of votes are elected to the Senate. The Commission on Elections administers elections for the Senate, with the Senate Electoral Tribunal deciding election disputes after a Senator has taken office.

Senators elected in 2007
Key: Boldface: incumbent, italicized: neophyte senator

*Senators are elected on a nationwide, at-large basis.
  Pimentel was declared the winner after the Senate Electoral Tribunal ruled in favor of his electoral protest against Zubiri, who had resigned in August 3, 2011.

Changes
These are the changes in membership after the proclamation of winners:

2007 Philippine general election